The 2005 Furman Paladins football team represented  Furman University as a member of the Southern Conference (SoCon) during the 2005 NCAA Division I-AA football season. Led by fourth year-head coach Bobby Lamb, the Paladins compiled and overall record of 11–3 with a mark of 5–2 in conference play, trying for second place in the SoCon. Furman advanced to the NCAA Division I-AA Football Championship playoff, where they beat Nicholls State in the first round Richmond in the quarterfinals before falling to SoCon and eventual national champion Appalachian State in the semifinals.

Schedule

References

Furman
Furman Paladins football seasons
Furman Paladins football